Lasiancistrus schomburgkii is a species of armored catfish native to Brazil, Colombia, Ecuador, Guyana and Peru.  This species grows to a length of  SL.

References

Further reading
 
 

Ancistrini
Freshwater fish of Brazil
Freshwater fish of Colombia
Freshwater fish of Ecuador
Fish of Guyana
Freshwater fish of Peru
Fish of the Amazon basin
Fish described in 1864
Taxa named by Albert Günther